Stephanie Lyn Beard (born August 27, 1981), better known by her stage name Sugar Lyn Beard, is a Canadian actress and radio personality. Her radio host persona uses the name "Suga BayBee", and as co-host of YTV's The Zone from 2001–2007, she was called "Sugar".

Early life
Beard was born in Scarborough, Ontario, Canada. Her Suga BayBee was also a character on the Mad Dog and Billie morning show formerly aired on Toronto radio station KISS 92.5. Beard's squeaky-voiced character began appearing on KISS when Beard was 19 years old and otherwise working as a sales clerk.

Career
Her voice in 2000 was most known as the voice of Sailor Mini Moon in the Cloverway adaptation of Sailor Moon.
From June 2001 to January 26, 2007, Beard hosted and produced The Zone, a series of short interstitial segments that aired between regular weekday programming on the Canadian children's network YTV. Between 2002 and 2007, the programming block was hosted by both Beard and Carlos Bustamante, another long-time YTV host that was the host of The Zone from 2002-2018. She also hosted additional programs like Sugar & Avril: A Zone Special. She and Bustamante hosted a weekly hour-long program, Plugged In, on the Corus Entertainment website boomboxbaby.ca.
 
She also had a column in the youth newspaper, Brand New Planet; it was distributed with subscriptions to the Toronto Star only. In 2006, the Star put her on the long list for Children's Entertainment, when creating their Essentially Canadian Top 10 lists.

Among her works, she played the role of Susan in the 2011 film 50/50 and the character Fiona in two episodes of season 6 of Weeds. She also played Krissy in the 2012 film For a Good Time, Call..., and Jeanie in the 2016 comedy Mike and Dave Need Wedding Dates.

Filmography

Film

Television

Radio
 Mad Dog and Billie on KISS 92.5 (2000–2001) – Suga BayBee

References

External links

1981 births
Living people
Actresses from Toronto
Actresses from Los Angeles
Canadian expatriate actresses in the United States
Canadian radio hosts
Canadian television actresses
Canadian television hosts
Canadian voice actresses
Canadian women television hosts
People from Scarborough, Toronto
Canadian women radio hosts
20th-century Canadian actresses
21st-century Canadian actresses